Leonardo Ferrari Carissimi (born November 27, 1983) is an Italian movie and stage director.

Life and career 
Leonardo Ferrari Carissimi was born in Rome, Italy.
From 2009, he is the director of "CK Teatro", the theatrical company of the "Teatro dell'Orologio", one of the oldest and most important theaters of the Capital. In 2011, he directed the movie Mr. America, which premiered on November 7, 2013. The movie stars actress Anna Favella as the protagonist, playing the role of Penny Morningstar, a young and successful art gallery director. The film is an independent and unique project, which gathers painting and cinema together and wants to show people how Andy Warhol really was and how his strange and controversial figure killed all the artists who composed his "Factory".

Theatre 
Hitchcock - a love story (2015/16)
Tutti i padri vogliono far morire i loro figli (2015)
Love - L'amore ai tempi della ragione permanente (2013/14)
Superstar (2011)
Delitto Pasolini-Una considerazione inattuale (2010)
Being Hamlet – La genesi (2009)
Amianto-Paura di avere paura (2007)

Filmography 
Mr. America (2013)
La Favola Bella (short film) (2015)

References 

1983 births
Living people